Eogaspesiea was a genus of Early Devonian rhyniophyte with a tangled mess of branching axes that reached 10 cm in length. These probably emanated from a rhizome. Its (probably) alete spores had thin walls.

References 

Devonian plants
Prehistoric plant genera